Facundo Mallo Blanco (born 16 January 1995) is a Uruguayan professional footballer who plays for Defensor Sporting as a defender.

Honours
Liverpool Montevideo
Segunda División Uruguay: 2014–15
CA Torque
Segunda División Uruguay: 2017

References

External links
 

1995 births
Living people
People from Montevideo
Uruguayan footballers
Uruguay youth international footballers
Uruguay under-20 international footballers
Uruguayan Primera División players
Uruguayan Segunda División players
Liga I players
Liga II players
Liverpool F.C. (Montevideo) players
Montevideo City Torque players
FC Dinamo București players
FC Rapid București players
Defensor Sporting players
Uruguayan expatriate footballers
Uruguayan expatriate sportspeople in Romania
Expatriate footballers in Romania
Association football defenders